Akwete town is the headquarters of Ukwa East local government area of Abia state, Nigeria. Akwete is located 18 Kilometers northeast of the oil-rich city of Port Harcourt and 18 Kilometers southeast of the commercial city of Aba. Akwete is an important community of the Ndoki and Igbo people in general, they belong to the Umuihueze II clan. Akwete is known in West Africa for its unique weaving.

In the early 19th-century Akwete was one of the main destinations of Aro slave traders and they brought Igbo and other people they had enslaved or purchased from other enslavers to the coast. One of the people who was brought to Akwete by this trade was Jaja of Opobo who later became the king of the city-state of Opobo. Akwete was also involved in the palm oil trade, and when Jaja was brought there while enslaved in about 1830 the palm oil trade had become the main export trade of Akwete.

Etymology
The origin of the name Akwete has over the years been a subject of controversy. In the typical Edo language, Akwete means thunder. However the Edo Version of Akwete does not in any way convey the same meaning because in the Ndoki dialect of Igbo language, Amadioha or Egbeligwe is the word for thunder. 
There is a version that asserts that the name Akwete emanated or originated from 'Aku-Ete'. This version is of the opinion that the name Akwete was derived from the rope palm tree cutters use in climbing the trees known as Ete. Another popular opinion is that the word emanates from the Ndoki Weaving Technology which Akwete women are famous for.

References 

Populated places in Abia State